The Gulf Coast League (GCL) Royals were a minor league baseball franchise in the Rookie-level Gulf Coast League from 1971–1978, 1982–1983 and 1985–2002. The club was owned and operated by the Kansas City Royals of Major League Baseball. The GCL Royals played games at Florida-based minor league and spring training facilities located in Sarasota (through 1987), Baseball City Stadium in Davenport (1988–1992; 1999–2002) and Fort Myers (1993–1998).

From 1979–1981, the Royals operated two GCL teams, the Gulf Coast League (GCL) Royals Blue and Gulf Coast League (GCL) Royals Gold, to accommodate a surplus of teenaged players. In 1974, Kansas City also fielded a separate Gulf Coast League (GCL) Royals Academy team for members of its experimental Baseball Academy.  The Academy team played alongside the GCL Royals; finishing 35–16 in the GCL standings that season, 4½ games ahead of the 29–19 GCL Royals, but the Royals Academy lost the league pennant by percentage points to the GCL Cubs.

In 2003, when the Royals moved their spring training operations to Surprise, Arizona, they simultaneously transferred their Rookie-level affiliate to the Arizona League.

Season-by-season

Notable alumni
 
Jeremy Affeldt
Carlos Beltrán
David Cone
Johnny Damon
Chad Durbin
Carlos Febles
Rich Gale
Jimmy Gobble
Tom Gordon
Mark Gubicza
Atlee Hammaker
Clint Hurdle
Ramón Martínez
Ken Phelps
Hipólito Pichardo
Glendon Rusch
Mike Sweeney
Rodney Williams
Willie Wilson

See also
Arizona League Royals

Baseball teams established in 1971
Baseball teams disestablished in 2003
Defunct Florida Complex League teams
Kansas City Royals minor league affiliates
Royals
1971 establishments in Florida
2003 disestablishments in Florida
Sports in Sarasota, Florida
Baseball in Fort Myers, Florida
Sports in Polk County, Florida